FC VSS Košice was a Slovak football club based in Košice which played in the Slovak 2. Liga during the 2016–17 season. The club officially ceased operations on 27 July 2017.

The club, founded in 1903, has won the Slovak League twice, the Slovak Cup five times and the Czechoslovak Cup once. The most successful eras of the club were in the 1970s and 1990s which they spent mostly in the top tier of Czechoslovak and Slovak Football. Two of the UEFA Euro 1976 champions namely Dušan Galis and Jaroslav Pollák played for Košice.

History

Early history
The club was founded in 1903 as Kassai AC. The club's colours were blue and yellow. In the 1910s, the club competed in the Hungarian championship. In 1909 Kassai AC won the Kingdom of Hungary Championship. Later they played in eastern group in Slovak-Subcarpathian division between 1935–38. In 1939–40 the club played Hungarian League I. Among the most successful Kassai AC players were Szaniszló, Šiňovský, the Drotár brothers, Klein, Lebenský, Dráb, and Pásztor. For many years, the club was based at the stadium on Sokoljevova Street with a capacity of 16,000 spectators. The stadium was often full. After the end of World War II the city's three clubs Kassai AC, Kassai Törekvés and ČsŠK were merged into one club named Jednota Košice. Jednota began playing in the Czechoslovak League in 1945. In the first season, they ended the league as fourth in Group B, which considered as a nice success at the time.

VSS

Kassai AC and Jednota became VSS in 1952. The team got the name from the Slovak word Strojári (Engineers, in English), due to the main sponsor being VSS (East-Slovakian Engineering). VSS became a stable member of the Czechoslovak First League and their best placing was second in 1970–71. In 1971 and 1973 VSS qualified for the UEFA Cup. In 1971 they won 2–1 against Spartak Moscow in the home leg and they drew 0–0 in Moscow, so that as the first team from Slovakia they progressed to the group stage of the Champions League. Two years later, VSS qualified for the UEFA Cup.  Against Honvéd FC they won 1–0 at home and lost 2–5 away. The most successful VSS players include Andrej Kvašňák, Titus Buberník, Jaroslav Pollák, Dušan Galis (Euro 1976 Champions both), Anton Švajlen, Ján Pivarník, Jozef Bomba, and Jozef Desiatnik. VSS was renamed ZŤS in 1978.

1990s
The twice Slovak football champions (1997, 1998) were relegated from the premier division in 2003 after the proposed sale of the club to Italian owners in 2001 by the former owner and late VSŽ steelmaking tycoon Alexander Rezeš fell through. Although Rezeš's dream to turn 1. FC Košice into a top European club never came true, he managed to lift an average second division team to the first group stage of the UEFA Champions' League in 1997–98. However, the next year's failure to make the same stage of the major European competition, and failure to defend the league title, combined with the change of government which undermined the position of the Rezeš clan (Alexander Rezeš was economy minister of Vladimír Mečiar's government in 1994–97) represented the beginning of the end of the "millionaires".  Their home stadium was the Všešportový areál.

1997–98 Champions League campaign
1. FC famously became the first Slovak club to reach the lucrative UEFA Champions League Group Stages when they did so in the 1997–98 season. Also during this Champions League campaign, 1. FC Košice became the first club in the Champions League history to record no points at all in the group stage, losing all their six games.

1. FC Košice are best known outside their homeland for their two clashes with Manchester United in the 1997–98 European Champions League group stages. Manchester United won both legs with the same score, 3–0. During this brief campaign in Europe's most prestigious club competition, Košice suffered a tragedy when midfielder Milan Čvirk was killed and striker Albert Rusnák was seriously injured in a car crash.

Recent history
2003–04 season, on the brink of financial collapse and relegation from the second division, the owners of 1. FC, were offered help by the president of Steel Trans Ličartovce Blažej Podolák, one of the favourites to advance to the premier league that season. Steel Trans also paid for the Čermeľ stadium in Košice, where all former 1. FC teams – now under the protective wings of Ličartovce played their matches. In 2004–05 season 1.FC Košice in effect became reserve team of Steel Trans Ličartovce, playing in the third division, group East. Košice, the second largest city in Slovakia, now had no club in the top two divisions (although many can remember two in the Czechoslovak federal league).

Reformed on 17 June 2005, FC Steel Trans Ličartovce was renamed MFK Košice. They ended the season gaining promotion back to the first division. In subsequent years MFK had minor successes, yet failed to win the league.

In 2008/09 season, the club won its first trophy in some 11 years, by beating Artmedia Petržalka in the final match of the Slovak Cup, in Senec. The match ended in a 3-1 win, with goals scored by Marko Milinković (28th minute), Róbert Cicman (56th minute) and Ján Novák (69th minute). The win granted Košice the right to compete in 2009-10 UEFA Europa League, which they entered in the Third qualifying round, in which they defeated FK Slavija Sarajevo 5–1 on aggregate, with Novák scoring two goals. In the subsequent Play-off, to which 3 of 4 Slovak teams qualified (Košice, Žilina and Slovan), Košice faced AS Rome, who were the 6th team of Serie A 2008-09. With the first match being played in Košice, the home side managed to stun the opponent by an early 5th-minute goal by Milinković, although thanks to two goals by Totti (the first coming from a controversial penalty) and Menez the away side took a 3-1 lead by 67th minute. However Ján Novák scored two goals, 71st and 81st minute, the second from a penalty, to complete the 3-3 draw against Rome. The following day, the headlines read: "Novák almost overshadowed Totti". It was one of the most memorable results of the club in recent history. In 2009, Nemanja Matić completed the biggest transfer in the history of the club, when he left for Chelsea, for an estimated €5.5 million and by mid-2010s, he became one of the biggest and most recognised midfielders in Europe.

MFK Košice won the Cup in 2013-14, yet their campaign in 2014-15 Europa League did not match the success of the 2009-10 Europa League, with Košice losing two matches against Slovan Liberec, 0-4 on aggregate.

Return to FC VSS Košice
The relegation was caused as, then MFK Košice, failed to obtain a license, after financial difficulties and debts. The change of the name occurred to popularity of the "VSS" acronym from the Communist era, when it represented "Východoslovenské Strojárne" (Easter Slovak Engineering Works - a large employer in Košice and the nearby region). The firm however went bankrupt in 2013 and as a result the acronym was given a new meaning: V - Vernosť, S- Sila, S- Sláva - (Faithfulness - Power - Glory). The club hoped to return to Slovak top division within a season.

While winning the Eastern Group of 2015-16 DOXXbet liga with 2 points lead over Tatran Prešov, the club finished 2nd overall (Championship Group), only 2 points behind their archrivals Tatran Prešov, which celebrated the return to the top division after three seasons in the DOXXbet Liga. Košice failed to get promoted for failing to pay off their liabilities towards Ivan Đoković, who played for MFK between 2010 - 2012, and had three decisive points deducted from their score in the Championship Group by the SFZ, based on verdict by FIFA.

Dissolution 
The club officially ceased operations on 27 July 2017. In August, the club's supporters' group announced their intention to reestablish the club and enter Slovak Sixth League for the 2018–19 season. They later decided to support a new club in Košice, FK Košice. They also talk about VSS succession.

Affiliated clubs
The following clubs were affiliated with VSS Košice:
  FC Zenit (2016-2017)

Home stadium

The stadium is in the Čermeľ district, a multi-use stadium in Košice, Slovakia. It is currently used mostly for football matches as the home ground of VSS Košice since 1997. The stadium holds 10,787 (8,787 seated) spectators and was built in 1970. Initially was the stadium used by Lokomotíva Košice and 1.FC Košice (now VSS) have played there since 1997. The Slovakia national football team played there a few matches, but the stadium does not meet UEFA criteria for international events today.

New stadium
The club planned construction of the new stadium for 13,000 spectators in neighbourhood of demolished Všešportový areál stadium. The estimated cost of the stadium is €18.5 million. The owner od stadium is Košická Futbalová aréna (KFA), city of Košice owned 85% and club VSS Košice owned 15%. The construction will start in 2017. If the schedule is met, the first matches could be played by mid-2019.

Supporters and rivalries

VSS Košice's most important rivalry is with FC Lokomotíva Košice. The match between them is called, Košické Derby (Košice Derby). VSS Košice and Lokomotíva Košice are both among historically the most successful football teams in the country. The next biggest rivalry is with 1. FC Tatran Prešov. Matches between these two clubs are referred to as the Východniarske derby (Eastern Slovak derby). They also have rivalries with ŠK Slovan Bratislava, FC Spartak Trnava and MŠK Žilina. VSS Košice supporters are called Viva Košice. VSS Košice supporters maintain friendly relations with fans of MFK Zemplín Michalovce and Czech Sparta Prague.

Historical names

Note: The club played 2004–05 season as Steel Trans Ličartovce reserve squad.

Honours

 Czechoslovakia
 Czechoslovak First League (1925 – 1938, 1945 – 1993)
  Runners-up (1): 1970–71
 Czechoslovak Cup (1961–1993)
  Winners (1): 1992–93
  Runners-up (3): 1963–64, 1972–73, 1979–80
 1.SNL (1st Slovak National football league) (1969–1993)
  Winners (3): 1973–74, 1977–78, 1992–93

 Slovakia
 Slovak Superliga (1939 – 1944, 1993 – Present)
  Winners (2): 1996–97, 1997–98
  Runners-up (3): 1994–95, 1995–96, 1999–00
 Slovak Cup (1961 – Present)
  Winners (5): 1972–73, 1979–80, 1992–93, 2008–09, 2013–14
  Runners-up (3): 1980–81, 1997–98, 1999–00
 Slovak Super Cup (1993 – Present)
  Winners (1): 1997
  Runners-up (3): 1998, 2009, 2014
 Slovak Second Division (1993 – Present)
  Winners (2): 2005–06, 2016–17

Czechoslovak and Slovak Top Goalscorer
The Czechoslovak League top scorer from 1944–45 until 1992–93. Since the 1993–94 Slovak League Top scorer.

1Shared award

Sponsorship

Club partners 
source
STEEL TRANS
City of Košice

Transfers
VSS have produced numerous players who have gone on to represent the Slovak national football team. Over the last period there has been a steady increase of young players leaving Košice after a few years of first team football and moving on to play football in leagues of a higher standard, with the Czech First League (Szilárd Németh and Miroslav Sovič to AC Sparta Prague, Vladimír Labant, Dávid Škutka and Matúš Kozáčik to SK Slavia Prague, Kamil Čontofalský to Bohemians 1905 in 1999; Marek Špilár to FC Baník Ostrava in 2000), Greece Superleague (Vladimír Janočko to Xanthi in 2000), German 2. Bundesliga (Jozef Kožlej to SpVgg Greuther Fürth in 1998), Israel League (Ruslan Lyubarskyi to Maccabi Netanya F.C. in 2000), Polish Ekstraklasa (Ondrej Duda to Legia Warsaw in 2014), Portugal Primeira Liga (Uroš Matić to S.L. Benfica in 2013). The top transfer was agreed in 2009 when  Nemanja Matić joined English FC Chelsea for a fee of €1.75 million,.

Record departures

*-unofficial fee

Record arrivals

*-unofficial fee

Results

League and Cup history
Slovak League only (1993–2017)
{|class="wikitable"
! style="color:#00509E; background:#FCCC06;"| Season
! style="color:#00509E; background:#FCCC06;"| Division (Name)
! style="color:#00509E; background:#FCCC06;"| Pos./Teams
! style="color:#00509E; background:#FCCC06;"| Pl.
! style="color:#00509E; background:#FCCC06;"| W
! style="color:#00509E; background:#FCCC06;"| D
! style="color:#00509E; background:#FCCC06;"| L
! style="color:#00509E; background:#FCCC06;"| GS
! style="color:#00509E; background:#FCCC06;"| GA
! style="color:#00509E; background:#FCCC06;"| P
! style="color:#00509E; background:#FCCC06;"|Slovak Cup
! style="color:#00509E; background:#FCCC06;" colspan=2|Europe
! style="color:#00509E; background:#FCCC06;"|Top Scorer (Goals)
|-
|align=center|1993–94
|align=center|1st (Mars Superliga)
|align=center|6/(12)
|align=center|32
|align=center|8
|align=center|11
|align=center|13
|align=center|35
|align=center|54
|align=center|27
|align=center|Quarter-finals
|align=center|CWC
|align=center|1R ( Beşiktaş J.K.)
|align=center|?
|-
|align=center|1994–95
|align=center|1st(Mars Superliga)
|  style="text-align:center; background:silver;"|2/(12)
|align=center|32
|align=center|15
|align=center|7
|align=center|10
|align=center|54
|align=center|42
|align=center|50
|align=center|Quarter-finals
|align=center|UI
|align=center|Group 10 (2nd)
|align=center| Pavol Diňa (13)
|-
|align=center|1995–96
|align=center|1st (Mars Superliga)
|  style="text-align:center; background:silver;"|2/(12)
|align=center|32
|align=center|21
|align=center|2
|align=center|9
|align=center|62
|align=center|33
|align=center|65
|align=center|1st round
|align=center|UC
|align=center|PR ( Újpest FC)
|align=center| Róbert Semeník (29)
|-
|align=center|1996–97
|align=center|1st (Mars Superliga)
|  style="text-align:center; background:gold;"|1/(16)
|align=center|30
|align=center|21
|align=center|7
|align=center|2
|align=center|61
|align=center|19
|align=center|70
|align=center|1st round
|align=center|UC
|align=center|1QR ( Celtic F.C.)
|align=center| Jozef Kožlej (22)
|-
|align=center|1997–98
|align=center|1st (Mars Superliga)
|  style="text-align:center; background:gold;"|1/(16)
|align=center|30
|align=center|21
|align=center|5
|align=center|4
|align=center|71
|align=center|24
|align=center|68
|  style="text-align:center; background:silver;"|Runners-up
|align=center|CL
|align=center| Group stage (Group B,4th)
|align=center|  Jozef Kožlej (14)
|-
|align=center|1998–99
|align=center|1st (Mars Superliga)
|align=center|4/(16)
|align=center|30
|align=center|19
|align=center|4
|align=center|7
|align=center|51
|align=center|26
|align=center|61
|align=center|2nd Round
|align=center|CL  UC
|align=center|2QR ( Brøndby IF)  1R ( Liverpool F.C.)
|align=center|  Ruslan Lyubarskyi (12)
|-
|align=center|1999–00
|align=center|1st (Mars Superliga)
|  style="text-align:center; background:silver;"|2/(16)
|align=center|30
|align=center|19
|align=center|4
|align=center|7
|align=center|57
|align=center|31
|align=center|61
|  style="text-align:center; background:silver;"|Runners-up
|align=center| 
|align=center|
|align=center|  Ruslan Lyubarskyi (15)
|-
|align=center|2000–01
|align=center|1st (Mars Superliga)
|align=center|9/(10)
|align=center|36
|align=center|10
|align=center|7
|align=center|19
|align=center|42
|align=center|61
|align=center|37
|align=center|1st Round
|align=center|UC
|align=center|1R ( Grazer AK)
|align=center|  Vladislav Zvara (8) 
|-
|align=center|2001–02
|align=center|1st (Mars Superliga)
|align=center|9/(10)
|align=center|36
|align=center|6
|align=center|13
|align=center|17
|align=center|30
|align=center|62
|align=center|31
|align=center|1st Round
|align=center|
|align=center| 
|align=center|  Radoslav Zabavník (6)
|-
|align=center|2002–03
|align=center|1st (Slovak Super Liga)
|  style="text-align:center; background:red;"|10/(10)
|align=center|36
|align=center|6
|align=center|12
|align=center|18
|align=center|41
|align=center|64
|align=center|30
|align=center|2nd Round
|align=center|
|align=center|
|align=center| Ľubomír Mati (10)
|-
|align=center|2003–04
|align=center|2nd (1. Liga)
|  style="text-align:center; background:red;"|16/(16)
|align=center|30
|align=center|4
|align=center|5
|align=center|21
|align=center|36
|align=center|75
|align=center|17
|align=center|1st Round
|align=center|
|align=center|
|align=center|?
|-
|align=center|2004–05
|align=center|3rd (2. Liga)
|align=center|
|align=center|
|align=center|
|align=center|
|align=center|
|align=center|
|align=center|
|align=center|
|align=center|Did not enter
|align=center|
|align=center|
|align=center|  Pavol Piatka (23)
|-
|align=center|2005–06
|align=center|2nd (1. Liga)
|  style="text-align:center; background:green;"|1/(16)
|align=center|30
|align=center|23
|align=center|4
|align=center|3
|align=center|67
|align=center|12
|align=center|73
|align=center|2nd Round
|align=center|
|align=center|
|align=center|  Pavol Piatka (22)
|-
|align=center|2006–07
|align=center|1st (Corgoň Liga)
|align=center|5/(12)
|align=center|28
|align=center|10
|align=center|5
|align=center|13
|align=center|31
|align=center|35
|align=center|35
|align=center|2nd Round
|align=center|
|align=center|
|align=center|  Jaroslav Kolbas (7)
|-
|align=center|2007–08
|align=center|1st (Corgoň Liga)
|align=center|6/(12)
|align=center|33
|align=center|13
|align=center|6
|align=center|14
|align=center|45
|align=center|44
|align=center|45
|align=center|Semi-finals
|align=center|
|align=center|
|align=center|  Ján Novák (17)
|-
|align=center|2008–09
|align=center|1st (Corgoň Liga)
|align=center|4/(12)
|align=center|33
|align=center|14
|align=center|10
|align=center|9
|align=center|48
|align=center|42
|align=center|52
|  style="text-align:center; background:gold;"|Winner
|align=center|
|align=center| 
|align=center|  Ján Novák (12)
|-
|align=center|2009–10
|align=center|1st (Corgoň Liga)
|align=center|11/(12)
|align=center|33
|align=center|8
|align=center|9
|align=center|13
|align=center|32
|align=center|57
|align=center|33
|align=center|Quarter-finals
|align=center|EL
|align=center| P-O ( A.S. Roma)
|align=center|  Ján Novák (12)
|-
|align=center|2010–11
|align=center|1st (Corgoň Liga)
|align=center|10/(12)
|align=center|33
|align=center|8
|align=center|9
|align=center|16
|align=center|28
|align=center|44
|align=center|33
|align=center|2nd Round
|align=center|
|align=center|
|align=center|  Marko Milinković (5)
|-
|align=center|2011–12
|align=center|1st (Corgoň Liga)
|align=center|11/(12)
|align=center|33
|align=center|6
|align=center|11
|align=center|16
|align=center|25
|align=center|40
|align=center|29
|align=center|Quarter-finals
|align=center| 
|align=center|
|align=center|  Erik Pačinda (6)
|-
|align=center|2012–13
|align=center|1st (Corgoň Liga)
|align=center|5/(12)
|align=center|33
|align=center|12
|align=center|11
|align=center|10
|align=center|38
|align=center|33
|align=center|47
|align=center|Quarter-finals
|align=center|
|align=center|
|align=center|  Dávid Škutka (13) 
|-
|align=center|2013–14
|align=center|1st (Corgoň Liga)
|align=center|5/(12)
|align=center|33
|align=center|13
|align=center|7
|align=center|13
|align=center|41
|align=center|40
|align=center|46
|  style="text-align:center; background:gold;"|Winners
|align=center|
|align=center|
|align=center|  Erik Pačinda (8)
|-
|align=center|2014–15
|align=center|1st (Fortuna Liga)
|  style="text-align:center; background:red;"|6/(12)1
|align=center|33
|align=center|11
|align=center|8
|align=center|14
|align=center|43
|align=center|48
|align=center|41
|align=center|Quarter-finals
|align=center|EL
|align=center|2QR ( Liberec)
|align=center|  Nermin Haskić (10)
|-
|align=center|2015–16
|align=center|2nd (DOXXbet liga)
|align=center|2/(24)
|align=center|30
|align=center|18
|align=center|5
|align=center|7
|align=center|48
|align=center|23
|align=center|56 2
|align=center|Quarter-finals
|align=center|
|align=center|
|align=center|  Kamil Karaš (10)
|-
|align=center|2016–17
|align=center|2nd (DOXXbet liga)
|align=center|1/(24)
|align=center|30
|align=center|19
|align=center|4
|align=center|7
|align=center|40
|align=center|27
|align=center|61 
|align=center|3rd Round
|align=center|
|align=center|
|align=center|  Mojmír Trebuňák (4)
|}
1 MFK Košice did not obtain a licence for the 2015–16 season
2 VSS Košice was docked 3 points for non–payment obligations.

European competition

UEFA-administered

Key – Pld: Played, W: Won, D: Drawn, L: Lost, GF: Goals For, GA: Goals Against, GD: Goal Difference.

Not UEFA-administered

Reserve team
MFK Košice B was the reserve team of MFK Košice. They recently played in the Slovak 3. Liga (Eastern division), with their best performance being in Slovak Second Division. MFK Košice "B" played home matches at Barca stadium, near Košice. MFK Košice"B" stopped functioning before 2014/2015 season.

Player records

Most goals

Notable players
Had international caps for their respective countries. Players whose name is listed in bold represented their countries while playing for MFK.

Past players who are the subjects of Wikipedia articles can be found here.

Managerial history

References

External links 

 Official website

 
Kosice, VSS
Association football clubs established in 1903
Sport in Košice
Kosice, VSS
1903 establishments in Slovakia
Association football clubs disestablished in 2017
2017 disestablishments in Slovakia